818 Kapteynia is a minor planet orbiting the Sun. This asteroid is named for the Dutch astronomer Jacobus Kapteyn.

References

External links
 
 

000818
Discoveries by Max Wolf
Named minor planets
19160221